The following is a list of squads for each nation that competed in men's football at the 2016 Summer Olympics in Rio de Janeiro. Each nation had to submit a squad of eighteen players, at least fifteen of whom had to be born on or after 1 January 1993, and three of whom could be older dispensation players. A minimum of two goalkeepers (plus one optional dispensation goalkeeper) had to be included in the squad.

Age, caps and goals as of the start of the tournament, 4 August 2016.

Group A

Brazil
The following was the Brazil squad in the men's football tournament of the 2016 Summer Olympics. The team of 18 players was officially named on 29 June and confirmed on 14 July. On 31 July, Fernando Prass left the squad due to elbow injury and was replaced by Weverton.

Head coach: Rogério Micale

* Over-aged player.
Douglas Costa was originally considered for the squad, but due to injury and his club Bayern Munich's refusal to release him, he was replaced by Renato Augusto. Fred, from Shakhtar Donetsk, was also considered for the squad, but his club did not release him for the tournament, and he was replaced by Walace.

Denmark
The following is the Danish final squad in the men's football tournament of the 2016 Summer Olympics. Yussuf Poulsen, Uffe Bech and Lasse Vigen Christensen left the squad due to several reasons and were replaced by Jacob Bruun Larsen, Jacob Barrett Laursen and Mathias Hebo.

Head coach: Niels Frederiksen

* Over-aged player.

Iraq
The following is the Iraq squad in the men's football tournament of the 2016 Summer Olympics. The team of 18 players was officially named on 14 July.

Head coach: Abdul-Ghani Shahad

* Over-aged player.

South Africa
The following is the South Africa squad in the men's football tournament of the 2016 Summer Olympics. The team of 18 players was officially named on 14 July.

Head coach: Owen Da Gama

* Over-aged player.

Group B

Colombia
The following is the Colombia squad in the men's football tournament of the 2016 Summer Olympics. The team of 18 players was officially named on 14 July. Andrés Rentería withdrew due to injury and was replaced by Arley Rodríguez.

Head coach: Carlos Restrepo

* Over-aged player.

Japan
The following is the Japan squad in the men's football tournament of the 2016 Summer Olympics. The team of 18 players was officially named on 1 July.

Head coach: Makoto Teguramori

* Over-aged player.

Nigeria
The following is the Nigerian squad in the men's football tournament of the 2016 Summer Olympics.

Head coach: Samson Siasia

* Over-aged player.

Sweden
The following is the Swedish squad in the men's football tournament of the 2016 Summer Olympics. The team of 18 players was officially named on 15 July. On 23 July, Jordan Larsson left the squad due to refusal of his club to release for the Games.

Head coach: Håkan Ericson

* Over-aged player.

Group C

Fiji
On 8 July, the Fiji Football Association announced a 24-man preliminary squad for the men's football tournament of the 2016 Summer Olympics. On 16 July, the final 18-man squad was officially announced. However, Kolinio Sivoki and Sakaraia Naisua were axed from the squad due to disciplinary reasons and Joseph Turagabeci joined the squad as a replacement.

Head coach:  Frank Farina

* Over-aged player.

Germany
The following is the Germany final squad in the men's football tournament of the 2016 Summer Olympics. Leon Goretzka, the team captain, was injured in the first match of the tournament, though no alternate was initially used. However, he was later replaced by goalkeeper Eric Oelschlägel for only the gold medal match.

Head coach: Horst Hrubesch

* Over-aged player.

Mexico
The following is the Mexico squad in the men's football tournament of the 2016 Summer Olympics. The team of 18 players was officially named on 7 July.

Head coach: Raúl Gutiérrez

* Over-aged player.

South Korea
The following is the South Korea squad in the men's football tournament of the 2016 Summer Olympics. The team of 18 players was officially named on 29 June. On 17 July, Song Ju-hun left the squad due to injury and was replaced by Kim Min-tae.

Head coach: Shin Tae-yong

* Over-aged player.

Group D

Algeria
The following is the Algeria squad in the men's football tournament of the 2016 Summer Olympics. The team of 18 players was officially named on 14 July.

Head coach:  Pierre-André Schürmann

* Over-aged player.

Argentina
The following is the Argentina squad in the men's football tournament of the 2016 Summer Olympics. The team of 18 players was officially named on 6 July and confirmed on 14 July. On 26 July, Manuel Lanzini left the squad due to injury and was replaced by Cristian Pavón.

Head coach: Julio Olarticoechea

* Over-aged player.

Honduras
The following is the Honduras final squad in the men's football tournament of the 2016 Summer Olympics. On 28 July, Kevin López left the squad due to injury and was replaced by Marcelo Espinal.

Head coach:  Jorge Luis Pinto

* Over-aged player.

Portugal
The following is the Portugal squad in the men's football tournament of the 2016 Summer Olympics. The team of 18 players was officially named on 14 July. On 17 July, Pité replaced Nuno Santos. On 21 July, Fábio Sturgeon left the squad due to injury and was replaced by Fernando Fonseca.

Head coach: Rui Jorge

* Over-aged player.

See also
 Football at the 2016 Summer Olympics – Women's team squads

References

2016 Summer Olympics Men's
squads
Lists of competitors at the 2016 Summer Olympics